Hunting organizations
Organisations based in Asker
1871 establishments in Norway
Organizations established in 1871